William Jonathan Phelps (May 4, 1928 - July 21, 2011), known as Jonathan Phelps, was a radio announcer on Atlanta, Georgia's classical music stations WGKA-FM and WABE-FM. Born in Tennessee, he moved to Atlanta in 1937, where he began as an announcer on WGKA-FM in 1956. He stayed with that station until it was sold in 1971 and its programming format changed, whereupon he went to WABE-FM, eventually became program director, and stayed with that station until his retirement in 1991. Known locally for his rich voice, he was also a Shakespearean actor and a part-time ballet dancer, having performed some roles with the Atlanta Ballet. On radio, he spoke without a trace of his native Tennessee accent, or indeed, any kind of Southern accent.

Phelps died at the age of 83 from emphysema, on July 21, 2011.

References

External links
 Atlanta Journal-Constitution online obituary

2011 deaths
American radio personalities
1928 births